The Women's time trial at the 2001 UCI Road World Championships took place over a distance of  in Lisbon, Portugal on 10 October 2001.

Final classification

Source

References

Women's Time Trial
UCI Road World Championships – Women's time trial
2001 in women's road cycling